"Take Me with U" is a song by Prince and the Revolution, and the final US single released from their album, Purple Rain (1984).

Background
The song is sung as a duet with Apollonia Kotero, and was originally intended to be performed by Vanity but shortly before filming began on the movie Purple Rain, Vanity famously chose to quit participation in the film altogether when she was offered what appeared to be a lucrative contract with Motown Records exec Berry Gordy and began filming The Last Dragon (An early demo of the song exists with her vocals and has circulated on bootleg recordings by collectors.) and ceased her romantic relationship with Prince. The song was then intended for the Apollonia 6 album to coincide with the film, but was pulled for the Purple Rain soundtrack. A result of this addition, Prince made cuts to the suite-like original "Computer Blue", which circulates among collectors in an extended version (a portion of this second section of "Computer Blue" can be heard in the film Purple Rain as Prince walks in on the men of The Revolution rehearsing). The original version of the song was about a minute longer.

Reception
Cash Box said that the song has "some beautiful melodies and some well-placed string sections which are proof of Prince’s varied talents."

Chart performance
The single was released with an edit of album track "Baby I'm a Star" as its B-side. In the US, it reached number 40 on the Hot Black Singles chart and reached number 25 on the top 40 chart. In the UK, the song was issued as a double A-side single, coupled with "Let's Go Crazy", reaching number 7 in February 1985.

Personnel
Credits are adapted from Prince Vault and the album’s Liner Notes
 Prince – lead vocals, guitars, overdubbed tom-toms, string arrangement
 Apollonia – co-lead vocals
 Wendy Melvoin – string conductor, guitars, background vocals
 Lisa Coleman – string arrangement, string conductor, keyboards, background vocals
 Matt Fink – keyboards, background vocals 
 Brown Mark – bass guitar, background vocals
 Bobby Z. – drums, percussion
 David Coleman – cello
 Suzie Katayama – cello
 Novi Novog – violin and viola

Track listing

7": Paisley Park / 7-29079 (US)
 "Take Me with U" (edit) – 3:42
 "Baby I'm a Star" (edit) – 2:55

References

1984 songs
1985 singles
Prince (musician) songs
Songs written by Prince (musician)
Male–female vocal duets
Warner Records singles
Song recordings produced by Prince (musician)
American psychedelic rock songs
Songs written for films